Vanessa Mendes da Silva Lima (born 29 March 1983), best known as Vanessa Giácomo, is a Brazilian actress and screenwriter.

Career 
Giácomo made her television debut in Cabocla in 2004 at the age of 20, where she met and fell in love with actor Daniel de Oliveira. She appeared with Eriberto Leão in Sinhá Moça in 2006.  She and Oliveira married and she gave birth to their first son in January 2008. She resumed work after the birth, filming O Menino da Porteira with singer Daniel, and received an offer to take part in a film on Jean Charles de Menezes, a Brazilian national who was mistaken for a terrorist and shot dead by police in London in 2005. Filming took place in London during 2008.

Filmography

Television

Film

Awards and nominations

References

External links

1983 births
Living people
People from Volta Redonda
Brazilian telenovela actresses
Brazilian film actresses